Rolling Stones is a 1916 American drama silent film directed by Dell Henderson and written by Edgar Selwyn. The film stars Owen Moore, Marguerite Courtot, Denman Maley, Alan Hale, Sr., Gretchen Hartman and William J. Butler. The film was released on August 23, 1916, by Paramount Pictures. Prints and/or fragments were found in the Dawson Film Find in 1978.

Cast 
Owen Moore as Dave Fulton
Marguerite Courtot as Norma Noggs
Denman Maley as Buck Ryder
Alan Hale, Sr. as Jerry Braden
Gretchen Hartman as Mrs. Braden
William J. Butler as Mr. Branigan 
Ida Fitzhugh as Mrs. Branigan

References

External links 
 

1916 films
1910s English-language films
Silent American drama films
1916 drama films
Paramount Pictures films
American black-and-white films
American silent feature films
Films directed by Dell Henderson
1910s American films